Chuhar is a small village in Nakodar tehsil, Jalandhar district, Punjab, India.  the 2011 Census of India, it had a population of 1,231 across 250 households.

References 

Villages in Jalandhar district
Villages in Nakodar tehsil